The 2004 FIA European Touring Car Championship season was the last European Touring Car Championship season. For 2005, the European Championship would become the World Touring Car Championship, and a one-off European Touring Car Cup would be held.

The season began at Monza on 28 March, and finished at Dubai after twenty races over ten meetings.

The Drivers' Championship title was won by Andy Priaulx for BMW Team Great Britain, who tied on points with BMW Team Deutschland's Dirk Müller, although Priaulx earned the title due to his greater number of victories during the season. AutoDelta's Gabriele Tarquini was third.

BMW won the Manufacturers Championship ahead of Alfa Romeo and SEAT. Tom Coronel won the Michelin Independents Trophy, while AutoDelta won the Michelin Teams Trophy.

Teams and drivers

Calendar

Results and standings

Races

Standings

Drivers' Championship

Independents' Trophy

Point system: 10-8-6-5-4-3-2-1 for top eight finishers.

References

External links

European Touring Car Championship seasons
European Touring Car Championship
2004 in European sport